The following is a partial list of airship accidents.

It should be stated that rigid airships operate differently than blimps which have no  rigid structure.

See also
 List of ballooning accidents

References

Airships
Airship
Accidents
Airships